"Pafko at the Wall", subtitled "The Shot Heard Round the World", is a text by Don DeLillo that was originally published as a folio in the October 1992 issue of Harper's Magazine. It was later incorporated as the prologue in DeLillo's acclaimed novel Underworld (1997), with minor changes from the original version, such as a new opening line. In 2001, "Pafko" was re-released as a novella, by Scribner. This is the same version as printed in Underworld, where the section is titled "The Triumph of Death", in reference to the painting by Pieter Brueghel the Elder.

The title character is Andy Pafko, who, as the Dodgers' left fielder, saw Bobby Thomson's famous shot go over his head.

External links
 Pafko at the Wall at the Harper's Magazine 
 Pafko at the Wall (Scribner edition) at the Internet Archive 

2001 American novels
Novels by Don DeLillo
Postmodern novels
American novellas
Works originally published in Harper's Magazine
Baseball novels
Fiction set in 1951
Novels set in New York City
Upper Manhattan